"Nas Is Like" is the first single from Nas' third album I Am.... The song is the sixth collaboration between Nas and producer DJ Premier. It was well received by critics as it was a change from the more commercial and pop-oriented singles from It Was Written and Nas, Foxy Brown, AZ, and Nature Present The Firm: The Album. The song contains a combination of braggadocios and introspective lyrics over a choppy string sample.

Content
The lyrical presence of Nas was clearly evident from the first lines: "Freedom or jail, clips inserted,/ a baby's bein' born
Same time my man is murdered,/ the beginning and end"
In the third verse of the song, Nas uses similes to describe his prowess.  These include: "I'm like a whole lot of loot, I'm like crisp money / Corporate accounts from a rich company / I'm like ecstasy for ladies, I'm like all races / combined in one man; like the '99 summer jam."

Production
In the 14 Deadly Secrets by DJ Premier, he said:

Samples
The song is also notable for featuring one of the most sought-after samples by cratediggers. For almost a decade since the track's release, the main sample used by DJ Premier remained unknown. However, in April 2008, an unnamed MP3 file featuring the original sample used was uploaded to the Internet by Dusty Kid from Strictly Breaks. Right after, the sample was identified as "Cantata of New Life" by John Rydgren. However, it was later revealed that the track was actually John Rydgren and Bob R. Way's 1966 song "What Child Is This?", from their record Thoughts on the Carols.

Other than this, the song also contains scratched vocal samples from Nas' previous songs "It Ain't Hard to Tell" from 1994 and "Street Dreams" from 1996. The song also samples bird chirps from Don Robertson's "Why" and a vocal sample from Biz Markie's "Nobody Beats the Biz".

Music video
The song's music video, directed by Nick Quested, shows Nas rapping in the Queensbridge projects and features cameos by NBA player Ron Artest and fellow Queensbridge rappers Nature and The Bravehearts.

Reception and influence
"Nas Is Like" was positively received on a commercial and critical level. It reached number 86 on the Billboard Hot 100, number 14 on the Canadian Singles Chart and peaked at number 3 on the Rap songs chart. M.F. DiBella of Allmusic justifies the success of "Nas Is Like" stating: "Superproducer Premier comes to save the day...["Nas Is Like" is] nothing short of Illmatic perfection. "Nas Is Like"'s symphonic composition is the perfect complement for an MC of Nas' supreme vocal quality and precise lyrics."

The song's popularity caused various songs to borrow "Nas Is Like"'s beat, structure and lyrics:
During his brief feud with Nas, Memphis Bleek recorded a song named "Memphis Bleek Is..." which stylistically mimicked "Nas Is Like".
On Royce da 5'9"'s 2007 mixtape The Bar Exam, he freestyles over the "Nas Is Like" instrumental and forms a song with a similar structure.
Lyrics from "Nas Is Like" were later sampled in Braille and Rob Swift's 2008 song "The IV".
 West Coast rapper Kendrick Lamar made a freestyle to this song in January 2013 on Hot97.
J. Cole uses the first part of Nas Is Like for the intro of his song, Let Nas Down. Nas himself would later appear on a remix of the song.
Apathy recorded a song named "Ap is like" with the same instrumental.
Rapper Wale sampled the song for his single "Folarin Is Like"
The song was included in the soundtrack of NBA 2K18.

Track listing

A-Side
 "Nas Is Like" (Main) (3:50)
 "Nas Is Like" (Clean) (3:57)
 "Nas Is Like" (Instrumental) (3:57)

B-Side
 "Dr. Knockboots" (Main) (2:25)
Produced by Poke & Tone
 "Dr. Knockboots" (Clean) (2:25)
 "Dr. Knockboots" (Instrumental) (2:25)

Charts

Weekly charts

Year-end charts

References

External links
Nas - Nas Is Like Official Hip Hop Music Video

1999 singles
Nas songs
Song recordings produced by DJ Premier
Songs written by Nas
1998 songs
Columbia Records singles
Songs written by DJ Premier